The Leicestershire and Rutland County Football Association, also simply known as the Leicestershire & Rutland CFA, Leicestershire FA or LRCFA, is the governing body of football in the counties of Leicestershire and Rutland.

Affiliated Leagues

Men's Saturday Leagues
Leicestershire Senior League
Leicestershire Church Football League
 Leicestershire Football Combination
Leicester & District Football League
Leicester City Football League
North Leicestershire Football League

Men's Sunday Leagues
Alliance Football League
Charnwood Sunday Football League
Hinckley & District Football League
Leicester Sunday Football League
Melton & District Sunday Football League

Women's Leagues
Leicestershire Senior County Women's Football League

References

External links

County football associations
Football in Leicestershire
Sports organizations established in 1886
Football in Rutland